The Central District of Nik Shahr County is a district (bakhsh) in Nik Shahr County, Sistan and Baluchestan province, Iran. At the 2006 census, its population was 50,842, in 10,144 families. At the 2016 census, its population had risen to 66,716. The district has one city: Nik Shahr. The district has four rural districts (dehestan): Chahan Rural District, Hichan Rural District, Mahban Rural District, and Mokht Rural District.

References 

Nik Shahr County
Districts of Sistan and Baluchestan Province
Populated places in Nik Shahr County